Be Here Then is a studio album by singer/songwriter Stephen Bishop. It is his first studio album in his traditional style since 1996's Blue Guitars.

Track listing
All songs written by Stephen Bishop, except where noted.

Personnel 
 Stephen Bishop – lead vocals, acoustic guitars
 Brad Cole – keyboards
 Mark Goldenberg – keyboards, electric guitars, bass
 Vivek Maddala – keyboards, bass, drums
 David Paich – keyboards 
 Jim Wilson – acoustic piano (3)
 David Frank – guitars
 Brian Ray – guitars
 Leland Sklar – bass
 Robin DiMaggio – drums
 Lenny Castro – percussion
 Julian Chan – backing vocals
 Jay Gore – backing vocals
 Monét Owens – backing vocals
 Dan Rothchild – backing vocals
 Leslie Smith – backing vocals

Production 
 Robin DiMaggio – producer (1, 2, 4, 5)
 Peter Bunetta – producer (3, 7)
 Mark Goldenberg – producer (3, 7), engineer (7)
 Vivek Maddala – producer (6, 8, 9, 10), engineer (6, 8, 9, 10)
 Eric Greedy – engineer 
 Ed Cherney – engineer (1, 2, 4, 5), mixing (1, 2, 4, 5)
 Julian Chan – engineer, mixing
 Mike Fennel – engineer, mixing
 Mike Castonguay – mastering 
 Angela Carole Brown – graphic layout
 Charles Villers – artwork, cover photography 
 Brandon Rackley – photography 

2014 albums
Stephen Bishop (singer) albums